Budhia Singh – Born to Run is a 2016 Indian Hindi-language biographical sports film directed by Soumendra Padhi. It is based on the life of Budhia Singh, the world's youngest marathon runner, who ran 48 marathons, when he was only five years old. The film stars Manoj Bajpayee as a coach and Mayur Patole as the title character. It won the Best Children's Film award at the 63rd National Film Awards in 2016.

Cast 
Manoj Bajpayee as Biranchi Das
Mayur Patole as Budhia Singh
Tillotama Shome as Sukanti
Shruti Marathe as Gita
Chhaya Kadam as Minister of Child Welfare
Gopal K Singh as litu
Prasad Pandit as JD Pattanaik
Gajraj Rao as Chairman, Child Welfare
Rajan Bhise as Dr Mohanty
Shivraj D Walvekar as B S Gill
Pushkaraj Chirputkar as journalist

Production

Director Soumendra Padhi had auditioned more than 1200 kids for the title role from different states including Odisha, Chhattisgarh, Pune, Delhi and Mumbai, before he finalized Mayur for the role.

Music
The music for the film is composed by Sidhant Mathur, Ishaan Chhabra and Hitesh Sonik while the lyrics have been penned by Abhishek Dubey,  Gopal Datt, Prashant Ingole and Vikrant Yadav.

References

External links
 Website
 

2016 films
Indian sports films
Indian biographical films
Biographical films about sportspeople
2010s sports films
Films set in Odisha
Running films
Best Children's Film National Film Award winners
Viacom18 Studios films
2010s Hindi-language films
Cultural depictions of Indian people
Cultural depictions of track and field athletes
2010s biographical films
Sports films based on actual events
Indian children's films
Films shot in Odisha